Chen Gang (born April 1965) is a Chinese politician currently serving as Communist Party Secretary of Qinghai. Previously, he served as Communist Party Secretary of the All-China Federation of Trade Unions. He spent much of his career in Beijing, before being transferred to Guizhou as party chief of Guiyang. He then served as Communist Party Secretary of the Xiong'an New Area and Vice Governor of Hebei, and a member of the Hebei provincial party standing committee.

Biography
Chen was born in Gaoyou, Jiangsu province, near Yangzhou. He attended Yangzhou Teacher's College between 1980 and 1984, where he studied chemistry. He then attended graduate school at Harbin Institute of Technology, majoring in applied chemistry and polymer materials. He joined the Chinese Communist Party in 1986. In 1987, he began studying for his doctorate degree in inorganic chemistry at Peking University. Beginning in 1990, he worked at the Beijing Glass Research Institute. In July 1994, he was promoted to deputy director of the research institute, and vice president at Beijing Yiqing Group. In July 2000, he became the deputy head of the commission on foreign trade and commerce of Beijing. In 2003, he took on his first political office, becoming deputy party chief of Chaoyang District, then district governor (confirmed in January 2004).

In October 2006, he was named party chief of Chaoyang District; in July 2012 he was named to the Beijing Party Standing Committee, along with, by coincidence, another person with an identical name, who was vice mayor. To disambiguate the two at routine meetings, Chen Gang (1966) was known as "Chen Gang (government)", and Chen Gang (1965) was known as "Chen Gang (Chaoyang District)". In June 2013 he was transferred to Guizhou to serve on the provincial standing committee, and then he was named party chief of the provincial capital Guiyang in 2013. In Guiyang, Chen was known for experimenting with policies that aimed to transform Guiyang and its surrounding areas from an agrarian backwater to a cloud computing hub.

In 2017, Chen was appointed Communist Party Secretary of the Xiong'an New Area, a vast area of development assigned by the state to supplement the growth of the Beijing metropolitan region. He was also made Vice Governor and concurrently a member of the Hebei provincial party standing committee.

References 

Politicians from Yangzhou
1965 births
Living people
Political office-holders in Beijing
Political office-holders in Guizhou
Harbin Institute of Technology alumni
Peking University alumni
Alternate members of the 19th Central Committee of the Chinese Communist Party
Members of the 20th Central Committee of the Chinese Communist Party